Heino Enden (born 13 December 1959 in Tallinn) is a retired Estonian professional basketball player who played mostly at the shooting guard position.

Basketball career
His most notable achievements include winning the World Championship as a member of the Soviet Union team in the 1982 in Bogota, Colombia and the gold, silver and bronze medals with the same team in the 1983, 1985 and 1987 EuroBasket competitions. He won the Soviet Union League championship twice as a member of the CSKA Moscow basketball team and ended his professional career as a player in 1996, after playing a season with the Tampereen Pyrintö in Finland. After retiring his playing career, he coached various teams in Estonia, including Estonia national basketball team between 2001-2004. His best result as a head coach was a win over 2000 Olympic silver France, the first game and win in Saku Suurhall. The game in 2001 finished 64-59.

Personal life
Heino Enden has a son with Russian rhythmic gymnast Galina Beloglazova, Anthony Enden, who has also played basketball at national level in Estonian minor teams. From his Moscow years he has remained good friends with teammate Andrei Lopatov and hockey player Igor Larionov.

Enden currently owns and operates "Nikolay", a pie buffet in Tallinn with his sister Pille Enden.

Achievements with club

CSKA Moscow
Soviet Union Championship: 1984, 1988
 Runner-up: 1985, 1986, 1987
BC Kalev
 Estonian Championship: 1992

See also
 1982 FIBA World Championship
 EuroBasket 1983
 EuroBasket 1985
 EuroBasket 1987

References

1959 births
Living people
Estonian basketball coaches
Estonian men's basketball players
FIBA EuroBasket-winning players
FIBA World Championship-winning players
Honoured Masters of Sport of the USSR
PBC CSKA Moscow players
Shooting guards
Soviet expatriate sportspeople in Finland
Soviet men's basketball players
Basketball players from Tallinn
Tampereen Pyrintö players
1982 FIBA World Championship players
KK Kalev players
Estonia national basketball team coaches